Chaya Singh is an Indian actress who predominantly works in Tamil and Kannada films and television shows. She started her acting career in Kannada films and has worked in Tamil, Malayalam, Telugu, Bengali and Bhojpuri films. She has a reputation of being very selective in her roles.

Early life
Singh belongs to a Rajput family. She grew up in Bangalore. She did her schooling at Lourdes School, Bangalore and studied for until twelfth there.

Career 
Her first film role was in Munnudi. She went to do more films in Kannada including Haseena which was directed by Girish Kasaravalli, Thuntata, which was a success, Dinesh Baboo's Chitte and Sai Prakash's Rowdy Aliya.

After having few chances in the Kannada industry she migrated to Tamil movies. Chaya Singh's most famous movie is Thiruda Thirudi in Tamil which has the popular song "Manmadha Raasa". She also acted in its Kannada remake Sakha Sakhi, which unlike the original was not successful. Chaya later acted in little known films Kavithai and Jaisurya and did item numbers in Arul and Thirupaachi, though she stated that she dislikes doing them. She returned to Tamil with Vallamai Tharayo and then starred in the supernatural thriller Anandhapurathu Veedu.

She has performed in Akasha Gange in Kannada which released in 2008. About her performance in the film, Rediff wrote, "The highlight of the film is Chaya Singh who has come out with an outstanding performance as a music teacher who comes to her lover's house to win over his family". Sify wrote, "This is Chaya Singh's yet another best performance. She speaks from her lovely eyes". She acted in the Kannada short film Simply Kailawesome. The film made on playwright T. P. Kailasam revolves around conversations between Kailasam and female protagonists from four of his plays. Chaya Singh played all the four characters: Paatu from Tollugatti, Eeke from Gandaskathri, Venkamma from Home Rule and Sule from the play Sule.

She has acted in two Malayalam films, too, Mullavalliyum Thenmavum and Police, both directed by V. K. Prakash. In 2008 she was acting in two Bhojpuri films. Her first Bhojpuri release was Mahamaayi. She has directed a Bengali film, too.

She has done supporting roles in Kannada TV shows such as E-TV's Sarojini and Prema Kathegalu. She has acted in Tamil serial Nagamma, airing on Sun TV. She was a judge in the show Kuniyonu Bara on a Kannada television channel. Since 2012, she acts in Telugu serial "Kanchna Ganga", airing on Maa TV. She has been doing a few Tamil films in the last few years.

Personal life
Chaya Singh's parents are Gopal Singh and Chamanlata. She married Tamil actor Krishna of Deivamagal fame, in June 2012.

Filmography

Short films

Television

References

External links

 

Living people
Actresses from Bangalore
Indian film actresses
Actresses in Malayalam cinema
Actresses in Kannada cinema
Actresses in Tamil cinema
21st-century Indian actresses
Indian television actresses
Actresses in Kannada television
Actresses in Tamil television
Actresses in Telugu television
Year of birth missing (living people)
Actresses in Telugu cinema